HD 28246 (HR 1404) is a solitary star located in the southern constellation Caelum. It has an apparent magnitude of 6.38, placing it near the max visibility to the unaided eye.

HD 28246 has a stellar classification of F5.5 V, indicating that it is an ordinary F-type main sequence star. At present it has 1.78 times the mass of the Sun and shines at 3.07 solar luminosities from its photosphere at an effective temperature of 6,519 K, giving it a yellow-white glow. HD 28246 has an iron abundance 105% that of the Sun, placing it at solar metallicity. At an age of 1.58 billion years, it spins leisurely with a projected rotational velocity of 8 km/s.

References

1404
20630
Durchmusterung objects
F-type main-sequence stars
028246
Caeli, 1
Caelum